The Carlos Palanca Memorial Awards for Literature winners for 2012. The awarding ceremonies were held on September 1, 2012, at the Peninsula Hotel Manila in Makati.

I. Filipino division

Dulang Pampelikula

1st - Rodolfo Vera (Death March)

2nd - Richard S. Legaspi (Primera Bella)

3rd - Mia A. Buenaventura (Ang Bulag na Musikero)

Dulang Ganap ang Haba

1st - Vincent M. Tanada (Ang Bangkay)

2nd - Luciano Sonny O. Valencia (Ang Penitensiya ni Tiyo Renato)

3rd - Allan B.Lopez (Melodrama Negra)

Dulang May isang Yugto

1st - Joshua Lim So (Joe Cool: Aplikante)

2nd - Renerio R. Concepcion (Kumandong Nakaiswat)

3rd - Erick D. Aguilar (Terminal)

Tula

1st - Enrique S. Villasis (Crocopedia)

2nd - Kristian Sendon Cordero (Pagsalat sa Pilat)

3rd - Alvin C. Ursua (Kumpuni)

Tulang Pambata

1st - John Enrico C. Torralba (Gusto Ko Nang Lumaki)

2nd - Peter Solis Nery (Sa Mundo ng mga Kulisap)

3rd - Nely T. Azada (Sampung Tula Para sa mga Bata)

Maikling Kuwento

1st - Mark Benedict F. Lim (Banaag)

2nd - Honorio Bartolome de Dios (Ang Tawo sa Puso ni Teresa)

3rd - Mar Anthony Simon dela Cruz (Darleng)

Maikling Kuwentong Pambata

1st - Will P. Ortiz (Ang Tatlong Bubwit at Bangkang Marikit)

2nd - Bernadette V. Neri (Atang sa Kaluluwa Nina Apong Salawal at Apong Saya)

3rd - Luz B. Maranan (Ang Pangat, ang Lupang Ninuno, at ang Ilog)

Sanaysay

1st - Niles Jordan Breis (Go-See, Kraw Gen, Intro: Sa Daigdig ng Promo)

2nd - Elyrah L. Salanga-Torralba (Utang Ina)

3rd - Jing Panganiban-Mendoza (Redempsiyon)

Kabataan sanaysay

1st - Jan Francis B. Asis (Sa Ingit ng Pinto)

2nd - Gerome E. De Villa (Sa Aking Pagbuklat sa mga Makabagong Pahina)

3rd - Jueliand Peter A. Perez (Madyik Bisikleta)

II. English division

Full-length play

1st - Robert Arlo B. De Guzman (Practical Aim)

2nd - Jorshinelle Taleon-Sonza (The Passion of Andres)

3rd - Jose Ma. D. Manalo (Manilatown)

One-act play

1st - No winner

2nd - Joachim Emilio B. Antonio (The Dust in Your Place)

3rd - Patrick John R. Valencia (In Bed with My Mother)

Poetry

1st - Carlomar Arcangel Daoana (The Elegant Ghost)

2nd - Charmaine L. Carreon (The Yonic Lover)

3rd - Jason Leo G. Asistores (Waiting and Other Poems)

Poetry for children

1st - Peter Solis Nery (Punctuation)

2nd - Anca Bautista (Magic Is and Nine Other Magical Poems)

3rd - Raymundo T. Pandan Jr. (The Ocelot and Other Poems)

Short story

1st - Rebecca E. Khan (In Transit)

2nd - Ian Rosales Casocot (It Always Breaks My Heart a Little to See You Go)

3rd - Lystra Aranal (Bright Lights)

Short story for children

1st - Grace D. Chong (The White Shoes)

2nd - Raymund M. Garlitos (Lauan, The Seed that Wanted to Fly)

3rd - Aleli Dew B. Ayroso (Mister World and His Magical Box)

Essay

1st - Hammed Q. Bolotaolo (Of Legends)

2nd - Martin V. Villanueva (Dao)

3rd - Iriwin Allen B. Rivera (Patterns)

Kabataan essay

1st - Katrina Bonillo (Chapter One: DOWNLOADING)

2nd - Sari Katharyn Molintas (Being Bookish)

3rd - Jhesset Thrina O. Enano (What We Are Losing)

III. Regional division

Short story – Cebuano

1st - Noel P. Tuazon (Duhiraw)

2nd - Richel G. Dorotan (Ang Tulo Ka Mayor sa Hinablayan)

3rd - Rev. Fr. Rey B. Araneta, CM (Abog sa Flyover)

Short story – Hiligaynon

1st - Alice Tan Gonzales (Lanton)

2nd - Dr. Jesus C. Insilada (Panubok sa Pula Nga Pulos)

3rd - Alain Russ Dimzon (Binukot)

Short story – Iluko

1st - Danilo B. Antalan (Dagiti Sala Ti Panawen)

2nd - Fernando Sanchez (Babato)

3rd - Sherma E. Benosa (Dagiti “No La Koma” ni Monika)

IV. Hall of Fame awardee for 2012:

Peter Solis Nery

References

Palanca Awards
Palanca Awards, 2012